The German-Hanoverian Party was a political party in West Germany. Founded in 1953 as a splinter group from the German Party (DP). The party claimed to be a continuation of the original German-Hanoverian Party, formed in 1866.  Its members rejoined the remnants of the German Party in 1962.

Defunct regional parties in Germany
Political parties established in 1953
Political schisms